Neelamalai Thirudan is a 1957 Indian Tamil-language swashbuckler film directed and edited by M. A. Thirumugam, produced by Sandow M. M. A. Chinnappa Thevar and written by S. Ayyaiah Pillai. The film stars R. Ranjan and Anjali Devi, with T. S. Balaiah, K. A. Thangavelu, P. S. Veerappa, M. K. Radha, E. R. Sahadevan, Kannamba and E. V. Saroja in supporting roles. It revolves around a man seeking to avenge his family that was separated during his childhood due to his greedy uncle.

Neelamalai Thirudan was originally planned with M. G. Ramachandran, and the script tailored to suit the actor's image, but Ramachandran did not give Thevar call sheet dates as he was committed to other projects; hence, Ranjan was cast. The film released on 20 September 1957 and became a success.

Plot 

A good-hearted brother has two siblings: a kind sister named Lakshmi and an evil brother named Nagappan, who lusts for the family's wealth. The kind brother has a son, and his sister has a daughter called Maragatham. Aware of Nagappan's plans, the good brother leaves the family home and entrusts his son to take care of his sister and her husband Thangappan. After learning of his brother's departure, Nagappan searches for him and his family and orders his henchman Nanjappan to kill them. The family gets separated. The boy, now grown up, takes up arms against his evil uncle. He helps the downtrodden, exposes villains and restores peace. In the end, the whole family is reunited.

Cast 
Actors
 R. Ranjan as Neelamalai Thirudan
 T. S. Balaiah as a police officer
 K. A. Thangavelu as Chithambaram
 P. S. Veerappa as Zamindar Nagappan
 M. K. Radha as Thangappan
 E. R. Sahadevan as Neelamalai Thirudan's father
 K. Sairam as Constable 101
 Sandow M. M. A. Chinnappa as Nanjappan
 Master Vijayakumar as young Neelamalai Thirudan

Actresses
 Anjali Devi as Maragatham
 Kannamba as Lakshmi
 E. V. Saroja as Chokki
 Baby Uma as young Maragatham

Production 
The producer Sandow M. M. A. Chinnappa Thevar wanted to make Neelamalai Thirudan with his close friend M. G. Ramachandran starring, and the script was tailored to suit the actor's image. To Thevar's surprise, Ramachandran did not give him call sheet dates as he was committed to several other projects, including Nadodi Mannan (1958). Thevar then signed on R. Ranjan, to Ramachandran's dismay. The film was written by S. Ayyaiah Pillai, and directed by Thevar's brother M. A. Thirumugam who also handled the editing. Cinematography was handled by V. N. Reddy, with C. V. Moorthy assisting. Two animal actors – a horse named Iqbal and a dog named Tiger – were prominently used.

Soundtrack 
Music was composed by K. V. Mahadevan and lyrics were written by Thanjai N. Ramaiah Dass, A. Maruthakasi and Puratchidasan. The song "Sathiyame Latchiyamai" underlines "the philosophy of life and the importance of helping the downtrodden and destroying the villains". It attained popularity, and is often aired on Tamil television channels.

Release and reception 
Neelamalai Thirudan was released on 20 September 1957, and became a success. According to historian Randor Guy, a contributing factor was Ranjan's Robin Hood-inspired performance. Jambavan of Kalki negatively reviewed the film, criticising Ranjan's performance and the numerous plot holes.

References

External links 
 

1950s action films
1950s Tamil-language films
1957 films
Films directed by M. A. Thirumugam
Films scored by K. V. Mahadevan
Indian swashbuckler films
Indian black-and-white films
Films scored by R. Sudarsanam
Robin Hood films